Zhar is a rural locality (a village) in Zhityovskoye Rural Settlement, Syamzhensky District, Vologda Oblast, Russia. The population was 17 as of 2002.

Geography 
Zhar is located 28 km southeast of Syamzha (the district's administrative centre) by road. Staraya is the nearest rural locality.

References 

Rural localities in Syamzhensky District